Dorcadion kazanciense is a species of beetle in the family Cerambycidae. It was described by Bernhauer and Peks in 2010.

References

kazanciense
Beetles described in 2010